Miss USA 2011 was the 60th Anniversary of the Miss USA pageant, held on the Las Vegas Strip at the Theatre for the Performing Arts in the Planet Hollywood Resort and Casino, Paradise, Nevada on Sunday, June 19, 2011. Rima Fakih of Michigan crowned her successor, Alyssa Campanella of California, at the end of this event. This was California's sixth Miss USA title and the first title since 1992. Campanella represented the United States at the Miss Universe 2011 pageant in São Paulo, Brazil on September 12, 2011.

This pageant gained attention on the internet, when a video of all the contestant's answers to the question, whether evolution should be taught in school, was put on YouTube. Only two contestants affirmed that it should be taught, with the others confusing the question with the debate on evolution of species vs. creationism, or stating that both should be taught.

Background

Selection of participants
Delegates from 50 states and the District of Columbia were selected in state pageants which began in July 2010 and concluded in January 2011. The first state pageant was Florida, held on July 10, 2010, while the final pageant was Arkansas, held on January 9, 2011. Initially, eight of these delegates were former Miss Teen USA state winners but the number increased to nine after one titleholder resigned and former Teen USA delegate succeeded her, and one former Miss America state winner.

Two state titleholders were appointed as a replacements after the original titleholders were unable to compete. Emily Johnson, the original Miss Maine USA 2011, resigned on April 17, 2011 due to attending her sister's wedding on the day of the pageant. She was replaced by Ashley Marble, who was the first runner-up of the Miss Maine USA 2011 pageant, and Shaletta Tawanna Porterfield, the original Miss Wisconsin USA 2011, resigned on May 12, 2011 after was being charged in Dane County Circuit Court of three felony theft charges. She was replaced by Jordan Morkin, who was the first runner-up of the Miss Wisconsin USA 2011 pageant.

Results

‡ Voted into Top 16 as America's Choice via Internet

Special awards

Order of Announcements

Top 16
 

 
Top 8

 

 
Top 4

Delegates

Background music
 Contestant Intros : "On the Floor" by Jennifer Lopez featuring Pitbull
 Swimsuit Competition : "Blow" by Ke$ha
 Evening Gown Competition : "Written in the Stars" by Tinie Tempah featuring Eric Turner (live performance)

Television ratings
In the first hour of the pageant, it earned NBC 6.6 million viewers, winning the timeslot.  In the second hour, viewership rose to 7.8 million, also winning its timeslot.  Both hours were the leader in the 18-49 demographic.

Notes

References

External links
 Miss USA official website
 

2011
June 2011 events in the United States
2011 beauty pageants
2011 in Nevada
Zappos Theater